Dworkin may refer to:
Dworkin (surname)
Dworkin Barimen, fictional character from The Chronicles of Amber
Dworkin's Game Driver, LPMud server

See also
Dorkin